Lushnikovka is a rural locality (a settlement) in Bobrov, Bobrovsky District, Voronezh Oblast, Russia. The population was 543 as of 2010. There are 9 streets.

Geography 
Lushnikovka is located 5 km east of Bobrov (the district's administrative centre) by road. Bobrov is the nearest rural locality.

References 

Rural localities in Bobrovsky District